Lynn Nixon (born 7 December 1960) is a former Australian racing cyclist. She won the Australian national road race title in 1996.

References

External links

1960 births
Living people
Australian female cyclists
Place of birth missing (living people)